Stuart Thomas Gillard (born April 28, 1950) is a Canadian film, writer, producer and television director. He is best known for directing the films Teenage Mutant Ninja Turtles III (1993) and RocketMan (1997). He also wrote and directed the romance film Paradise in 1982, his directing debut.

As a television director, Gillard's credits include Bordertown, The Outer Limits, the original Charmed and its reboot series, One Tree Hill and 90210. He has also directed numerous television films, many for ABC Family and Disney Channel such as Girl vs. Monster and Twitches.

As an actor, Gillard won the Canadian Film Award for Best Actor in 1975 for his performance as a journalist in the film Why Rock the Boat?, and appeared in the 1970s sitcom Excuse My French.

Acting filmography

References

External links
 

1950 births
Living people
Canadian male film actors
Film directors from Alberta
Canadian male screenwriters
Canadian male television actors
Canadian television directors
Canadian television producers
People from the County of Paintearth No. 18
Male actors from Alberta
Directors Guild of America Award winners
Best Actor Genie and Canadian Screen Award winners
20th-century Canadian screenwriters
20th-century Canadian male actors